Section 91(2) of the Constitution Act, 1867, also known as the trade and commerce power, grants the Parliament of Canada the authority to legislate on:

The development of Canadian constitutional law has given this power characteristics that are unique from those that are specified in the United States Constitution's Commerce Clause and the Australian Constitution's interstate trade and commerce power.

Initial jurisprudence
First examined in Citizen's Insurance Co. v. Parsons (1881), Sir Montague Smith of the Judicial Committee of the Privy Council determined its scope thus:

Therefore, Parsons establishes three basic propositions about the trade and commerce power that have underlined all subsequent jurisprudence:

Initially the scope for extraprovincial trade was set very narrowly by the Privy Council. In the Board of Commerce case, the Privy Council suggested that the trade and commerce power applied only as an ancillary power to some other valid federal power. This principle was eventually rejected in Toronto Electric Commissioners v. Snider and Proprietary Articles Trade Association v. Attorney General of Canada, but the power was still read strictly.

In R. v. Eastern Terminal Elevator Co. (1925), a federal law regulating trade of provincially produced grain destined entirely for export was found not to be within the meaning of extraprovincial trade. As Duff J. (as he then was) noted in his opinion:

By the 1930s, as noted succinctly in the Fish Canneries Reference and then subsequently in the  Aeronautics Reference, the division of responsibilities between federal and provincial jurisdictions was summarized as follows by Lord Sankey:

Murphy v. C.P.R. (1958): Murphy overturns Eastern Terminal Elevators. Change from '25 -’58 is that the Gov of Canada has declared all grain elevators to be working for the "general advantage of Canada." Every Mill and recipient was numbered under S.92 (c) and was taken control of by the Wheat board.

Modern interpretation by the Supreme Court of Canada

With the abolition of appeals to the Privy Council, the interpretation of the power became broader. In Caloil Inc. v. Canada (1971) the Court upheld a law prohibiting the movement of imported oil as a form of regulating inter-provincial trade. As noted in the majority judgment by Pigeon J.:

Provincial jurisdiction over extraprovincial trade and commerce

The Court has also considered the effect of provincial law on the trade and commerce power. In Carnation Co. v. Quebec Agricultural Marketing Board, Martland J. held that provincial regulations that had an incidental effect on extraprovincial trade were valid:

However, as held in Attorney-General for Manitoba v. Manitoba Egg and Poultry Association et al., if the provincial scheme limits the free flow of trade between provinces than it will be struck down. As noted by Laskin J. (as he then was) in the latter case:

A significant decision with impact on Canadian federalism was made in the Reference re Agricultural Products Marketing Act (1978) where the Supreme Court upheld a federal egg marketing scheme that imposed quotas of different provinces. This was a particularly broad interpretation of extraprovincial trade as it included even egg producers who did not export their products. In endorsing the federal-provincial scheme that had been established, Pigeon J. stated:

There has been discussion as to whether Canadian jurisprudence ought to adopt an approach similar to the dormant commerce clause doctrine in the United States, in order to better address conflicts between the federal and provincial jurisdictions.

Modern developments on the general regulation of trade and commerce

In General Motors of Canada Ltd. v. City National Leasing, Dickson C.J. listed five indicia of competence for the Parliament of Canada to legislate:

The regulation of general trade must be broad and sweeping, and cannot single out a particular trade or industry. In Labatt Breweries v. Canada, Estey J. held that the regulation of the composition of "light beer" under the Food and Drugs Act was invalid as it was too narrow to be directed towards trade.

Such post-General Motors analysis is still considered to be vague and problematical in many respects, as it does not lend itself easily to either categorical or balancing styles of analysis.

How a matter becomes one of national concern is governed by the principles stated by Le Dain J. in R. v. Crown Zellerbach Canada Ltd.:

The general trade branch was also considered in 2011 in Reference re Securities Act, where the Court was asked to give its opinion on the Federal Government's proposal to federalize the regulation of the securities industry in Canada. In dismissing the attempt as being unconstitutional as currently drafted, the Court noted:

Notes

Constitution of Canada
Federalism in Canada